Corry–Lawrence Airport  is a public use airport located one nautical mile (2 km) south of the central business district of Corry, a city in Erie County, Pennsylvania, United States. It is owned by the Airport Authority City of Corry, also known as the Corry Lawrence Airport Authority. This airport is included in the National Plan of Integrated Airport Systems for 2011–2015, which categorized it as a general aviation facility.

Facilities and aircraft 
Corry–Lawrence Airport covers an area of 69 acres (28 ha) at an elevation of 1,766 feet (538 m) above mean sea level. It has one runway designated 14/32 with an asphalt surface measuring 4,101 by 75 feet (1,250 x 23 m).

For the 12-month period ending July 30, 2012, the airport had 3,820 aircraft operations, an average of 10 per day: 99.5% general aviation and 0.5% military. At that time there were 12 aircraft based at this airport: 83% single-engine, 8% multi-engine, and 8% helicopter.

See also 
 List of airports in Pennsylvania

References

External links 
 Aerial image as of April 1994 from USGS The National Map
 

Airports in Pennsylvania
Transportation buildings and structures in Erie County, Pennsylvania